is a 1965 Japanese film directed by Kihachi Okamoto and starring Toshiro Mifune, Koshiro Matsumoto, Yūnosuke Itō, and Michiyo Aratama. It is set in 1860, immediately before the Meiji Restoration changed Japanese society forever by doing away with the castes in society and reducing the position of the samurai class.

Plot summary
The film tells the story of Niiro Tsurichiyo (Mifune) as the illegitimate son of a powerful nobleman, and the way of his life that made him a swordfighter but also a social outcast. He joins forces with the multiple clans against the Lord of Hikone, Sir Ii Kamonnokami Naosuke. Ii is the right hand of the shogunate and brought upon himself the wrath of the Satsuma, Mito, and Choshuu provinces after making an unpopular choice for the appointment of the 14th shogunate. Many critics arose after the controversial appointment, and Ii initiated the Ansei Purge to quiet critics of his choices. This, in turn, led to an assassination plot hatched by the three provinces in order to remove Ii from his position of power. The shoguns also weeding out Ii's spies from the plot. The film is based on a novel, which in turn was inspired by the historical Sakuradamon incident, in which the feudal lord Ii Naosuke was assassinated outside the Sakurada Gate of Edo Castle.

Cast 
Toshiro Mifune - Tsuruchiyo Niiro
Keiju Kobayashi - Einosuke Kurihara
Michiyo Aratama - Okiku / Kikuhime
Yūnosuke Itō - Kenmotsu Hoshino
Eijirō Tōno - Masagoro Kisoya
Tatsuyoshi Ehara - Ichigoro Hayama
Tadao Nakamaru - Shigezo Inada
Kaoru Yachigusa - Mitsu
Haruko Sugimura - Tsuru
Nami Tamura - Yae
Shiro Otsuji - Kaname Kojima
Toshio Kurosawa - Itamura Katsunoshin
Yoshio Inaba - Keijiro Sumita
Akihiko Hirata - Sohei Masui
Hideyo Amamoto - Matazaburo Hagiwara
Takashi Shimura - Narihisa Ichijō
Matsumoto Kōshirō VIII - Ii Naosuke

Production
Samurai Assassin was a production of both Toho and Mifune Productions. It is based on the book Samurai Japan by Jiromasa Gunji.

Release
Samurai Assassin was released in Japan on January 3, 1965. The film was released in the United States on March 18, 1965 where it was distributed by Toho International. The film's title was apparently changed from Samurai to Samurai Assassin in the United States to avoid confusion with Hiroshi Inagaki's film Samurai (Miyamoto Musashi) from 1954.

Reception
In a contemporary review, "Robe." of Variety declared that samurai film was not "superb" but "very good", noting that Toshiro Mifune and "the entire cast, particularly the men, give excellent portrayals" and that Hiroshi Murai's "crisp black and white photography is more effective in the outdoor, dead-of-winter panoramas and fight scenes"

See also
Hitokiri

Footnotes

References

External links 
 

Films directed by Kihachi Okamoto
1964 films
1960s Japanese-language films
Jidaigeki films
Samurai films
Films with screenplays by Shinobu Hashimoto
Films produced by Tomoyuki Tanaka
Films scored by Masaru Sato
Toho films
Films set in Bakumatsu
1960s Japanese films